The Singlewell Infrastructure Maintenance Depot is a railway maintenance depot located near to the Gravesend ward of Singlewell, Kent, in the United Kingdom.  The depot is located between the A2 road and High Speed 1 (Channel Tunnel Rail Link).  It lies halfway between Ebbsfleet International railway station and the Medway Viaducts, and is connected via a spur at the Singlewell freight loops.

When originally constructed in 2007, the area between the A2 and the depot formed a field, but the subsequent long-planned realignment of the A2 meant that the road now runs closer to the depot.  The depot has fuelling facilities, workshops, plant storage and offices.

References

External links
 Depot Information

Railway depots in England